LaKendrick "Ken" Jones (born September 8, 1979) is a former American football lineman who played six seasons in the Arena Football League with the Columbus Destroyers, Los Angeles Avengers and Georgia Force. He played college football at South Carolina State University. He was also a member of the San Francisco 49ers of the National Football League.

College career
Jones played for the South Carolina State Bulldogs from 1998 to 2002. He played in all 12 games his senior year in 2002, recording 53 tackles, 10 sacks, two pass breakups and three forced fumbles.

Professional career

San Francisco 49ers
Jones signed with the San Francisco 49ers on May 2, 2003, after going undrafted in the 2003 NFL Draft. He was released by the 49ers on July 16, 2003.

Columbus Destroyers
Jones was signed by the Columbus Destroyers on November 14, 2003. He played for the Destroyers from 2004 to 2007, earning First Team All-Arena honors in 2007.

Los Angeles Avengers
Jones signed with the Los Angeles Avengers on October 29, 2007, and played for the team during the 2008 season.

Georgia Force
Jones was signed by the Georgia Force on May 3, 2011.

References

External links
Just Sports Stats

Living people
1979 births
Players of American football from Augusta, Georgia
American football offensive linemen
American football defensive linemen
African-American players of American football
South Carolina State Bulldogs football players
Columbus Destroyers players
Los Angeles Avengers players
Georgia Force players
21st-century African-American sportspeople
20th-century African-American sportspeople